Frida von Kaulbach (1871–1948) was a Danish violinist who performed as Frida Scotta.  She was born Frida Schytte in Copenhagen on 31 March 1871 and married the painter Friedrich August von Kaulbach in 1897.

References 

Danish classical violinists
Danish women violinists
Women classical violinists
Danish emigrants to Germany
1871 births
1948 deaths
Von Kaulbach family
19th-century classical violinists
19th-century Danish musicians
19th-century Danish women musicians
20th-century classical violinists
20th-century Danish musicians
20th-century Danish women musicians
Musicians from Copenhagen